Government-access television (GATV) is a type of specialty television channel created by government entities (generally local governments) and broadcast over cable TV systems or, in some cases, over-the-air broadcast television stations. GATV programming generally deals with public affairs, board meetings (i.e. city council, county commission, and school board), explanation of government services, and other public-service related programming such as public service announcements and longer public information films.

In the United States, laws regarding GATV are contained in the US Code, title 47, section 531, and are enforced by the Federal Communications Commission. Since cable systems are privately owned entities (unlike broadcast television), the must-carry requirement for GATV channels is often drawn out in local franchising agreements for the municipality or county it operates in.

GATV is often associated with public-access television, such as with the term PEG channels.

Statewide government access channels

See also

 C-SPAN
 Public, educational, and government access (PEG)

Law of the United States
Federal Communications Commission
United States communications regulation
Broadcast law
Television in the United States
Television terminology